Minneapolis is the most populous city in the U.S. state of Minnesota.

Minneapolis may also refer to:

Places
Minneapolis–Saint Paul, the most populous urban area in the U.S. state of Minnesota
Minneapolis, Kansas, an American city in Ottawa County
Minneapolis, North Carolina, an American community in Avery County

Other uses
Minneapolis, St. Paul and Sault Ste. Marie Railroad, an American railway also known as the "Soo Line"
Minneapolis Shoal Light Station, a lighthouse near Green Bay in the U.S. state of Michigan
USS Minneapolis, several ships of the United States Navy